Oxford Township is one of the twenty-two townships of Coshocton County, Ohio, United States. The 2010 census reported 1,527 people living in the township.

Geography
Located in the far eastern part of the county, it borders the following townships:
Adams Township - north
Salem Township, Tuscarawas County - northeast corner
Oxford Township, Tuscarawas County - east
Wheeling Township, Guernsey County - southeast
Linton Township - southwest
Lafayette Township - west
White Eyes Township - northwest corner

No municipalities are located in Oxford Township.

Name and history
It is one of six Oxford Townships statewide.

Oxford Township was organized in 1811. The Pittsburgh, Cincinnati and St. Louis Railway had a depot in Oxford Township at Oxford near the center of the township.

Government
The township is governed by a three-member board of trustees, who are elected in November of odd-numbered years to a four-year term beginning on the following January 1. Two are elected in the year after the presidential election and one is elected in the year before it. There is also an elected township fiscal officer, who serves a four-year term beginning on April 1 of the year after the election, which is held in November of the year before the presidential election. Vacancies in the fiscal officership or on the board of trustees are filled by the remaining trustees.

References

External links
County website

Townships in Coshocton County, Ohio
Townships in Ohio